Setian may refer to:
Setians, members of the Temple of Set
Setians, a fictional species in the Something Wicked Saga

See also
Sethian